William Sprigg (1770 – September 9, 1827) was an American attorney who twice served as Justice of the Ohio Supreme Court, as well as adjudicated on the Superior Court of the Orleans Territory and the highest court of the Illinois Territory.

Early life
Sprigg was born in 1770 in Prince George's County, Maryland to Joseph Sprigg and Hannah Lee. His uncle, Thomas Sprigg, was a Member of Congress from Maryland from 1793–1797. His half-brother, Samuel Sprigg, was Governor of Maryland from 1818-1820.

Career
Sprigg headed westward to Hagerstown and Cumberland, Maryland (where relatives were merchants) then continued along the Ohio River. He became a pioneer and early attorney in Adams County, Ohio, then in the Northwest Territory. When Ohio became a state in 1803, the state legislature appointed Sprigg to the Ohio Supreme Court. He served as a justice of the Supreme Court from April 1803 to April 1806, and again from 1808 to 1810. During the interim period, Sprigg received an appointment from President Thomas Jefferson to serve on the highest court in the Territory of Orleans, which he did from January 1806 to November 1808.

In 1812, Governor Ninian Edwards of the newly formed Illinois Territory appointed Sprigg as a judge for that territory. Sprigg served on the Illinois court for several years alongside Jesse B. Thomas and Stanley Griswold. However, when Illinois was on the verge of becoming a state, he and Thomas became the center of controversy about the relative relationship between the judicial and legislative branches, and both wrote to the U.S. Congress. By April, 1818 Judge Sprigg was either removed or had resigned from the bench.
When Illinois became a state in December 1818, the Illinois House of Representatives approved none of the territorial judges to the newly formed Illinois Supreme Court. Sprigg sought nomination for Judge of the United States District Court for the District of Illinois, but failed.

Death and legacy

Judge Spriggs returned eastward, moving to Hagerstown, Maryland, where he died among relatives on September 9, 1827.
Sprigg Township in Adams County, Ohio is named for Judge Sprigg.

References

1770 births
Justices of the Louisiana Supreme Court
United States federal judges appointed by Thomas Jefferson
19th-century American judges
People from Prince George's County, Maryland
1827 deaths
Justices of the Ohio Supreme Court
Illinois Territory officials
Politicians from Hagerstown, Maryland
Sprigg family